Gedik is a village in the District of Haymana, Ankara Province, Turkey. It is located approximately 42 miles (67 km) South-West of Ankara, the country's capital.

The village is populated by the Kurdish Şêxbizin tribe.

References

Villages in Haymana District

Kurdish settlements in Ankara Province